Ejler Bille (6 March 1910 – 1 May 2004) was a Danish artist.

Biography
Ejler Bille was born in Odder, Denmark. He was the son of Torben Holger Bille and Anna Kirstine Lysabild Jensen. Bille graduated from Birkerød State School in 1930, and then studied at the arts and craft school (Kunsthåndværkerskolen) in Copenhagen with Bizzie Høyer 1930–1932 and the Royal Danish Academy of Art in 1933. In 1931, he made his debut at the Artists' Autumn Exhibition (Kunstnernes Efterårsudstilling).

Bille joined Linien in 1934, Corner in 1940 and CoBrA in 1949. He had concentrated on small sculptures, but moved into painting after joining CoBrA. In 1969 he was a guest professor at the Royal Danish Academy of Art.

Awards
1960: Eckersberg Medal
1969: Thorvaldsen Medal
1987: Prince Eugen Medal
2001: Amalienborg Prize

See also
List of Danish painters

References

External links 
Ejler Bille at Schäfer Grafisk Værksted

1910 births
2004 deaths
People from Odder Municipality
20th-century Danish painters
21st-century Danish painters
Abstract painters
Modern sculptors
Royal Danish Academy of Fine Arts alumni
Danish watercolourists
Recipients of the Thorvaldsen Medal
Recipients of the Eckersberg Medal
20th-century Danish sculptors
20th-century Danish male artists
Recipients of the Prince Eugen Medal
Bille family